Kouilou is a department of the Republic of the Congo. Covering the country's coastline, it has an area of 13,650 square kilometres and at the start of 2007 it was home to about 91,955 people. The department borders Niari Department, the commune of Pointe-Noire, and internationally, Gabon and the Cabinda area of Angola. The regional capital was Hinda.  Principal cities and towns include Madingo-Kayes and Mvouti.

Since 2002 the town of Loango has been the capital of the Kouilou region.

Kouilou is also the name of a river, the Kouilou-Niari River.

Administrative divisions 
Kouilou Department is divided into six districts:

Districts 
 Hinda District
 Madingo-Kayes District
 Mvouti District
 Kakamoeka District
 Nzambi District
 Tchiamba-Nzassi District

Villages and towns
 

Ngamaba-Mfilou

References

Sources

External links

 
Departments of the Republic of the Congo